Nowodworze is a village in the administrative district of Gmina Tarnów, within Tarnów County, Lesser Poland Voivodeship, in southern Poland.

The village has a population of 700.

References

Nowodworze